Stephan Bernsee (born 1971) is a digital signal processing applications developer from Germany.

Background 
Bernsee is the founder of the audio software company Prosoniq and the principal developer of the sound synthesis technology used in the Hartmann Neuron series of synthesizers, the audio timescale-pitch modification technology behind Prosoniq TimeFactory, its popular vocoder OrangeVocoder and the sonicWORX Isolate application which does pattern detection to allow extracting, manipulating and suppressing individual notes and sounds within a song. He holds a couple of patents, including one for localizing audio in 3D space.

In 2011 he co-founded Zynaptiq, a Hannover-based startup company specializing in reverb removal, polyphonic pitch modification and automatic optimization of music tracks based on artificial intelligence.

References

1971 births
Living people
German computer programmers